The men's K-2 1000 metres was a competition in canoeing at the 1956 Summer Olympics. The K-2 event is raced by two-man canoe sprint kayaks. Heats and final took place on December 1.

Medalists

Heats
The 15 teams first raced in three heats.  The top three teams in each heat advanced directly to the final.

The Finnish team originally finished second in their heat prior to their disqualification.

Final

References

1956 Summer Olympics official report. p. 404.
Sports-Reference.com 1956 K-2 1000 m results.

Men's K-2 1000
Men's events at the 1956 Summer Olympics